The Audi 5 Series DTM (also known as the Audi A5 DTM (2012) later Audi RS5 DTM (2013-2018)) is a touring car constructed by the German car manufacturer Audi AG for use in the Deutsche Tourenwagen Masters. It was developed in 2011 and has been raced in DTM seasons 2012-2018 before being replaced by updated turbo version of Audi RS5 Turbo DTM from 2019 season onwards. It was designed by former Audi Head of Research and Development Wolfgang Dürheimer. The A5 DTM replaced the retired Audi A4 DTM at the end of the 2011 season and based on the production Audi A5.

A5 DTM
Audi began development, design and construction of the A5 DTM chassis in October 2010. The first A5 DTM chassis was assembled in May 2011, with the first vehicle completed in late-July. Codenamed R17 it was intended to see its first race in the 2012 DTM season. Replacing the successful A4 DTM which had been raced since 2004, the A5 had large shoes to fill.  Built by Audi Sport in Ingolstadt, the completed A5 DTM was revealed at Frankfurt Motor Show on 12 September 2011.

It features steering wheel-mounted paddle shifters, engine electronics (Bosch MS 5.1) and the central display from the Audi R8 LMS, larger and wider tires from Hankook, 32-gallons safety fuel tank inside carbon fiber cell, and a large rear wing. In accordance with DTM regulations, side-impact zones designed by Zylon and Rohacell are incorporated into construction of the car. The fuel tank is also integrated into the carbon fiber monocoque for greater safety and reduced fire risk.

Début
With the homologation of the A5 DTM completed on 1 March 2012, the car's race début was at the 2012 Hockenheimring DTM round on 29 April 2012. Audi Sport Team Abt's Mattias Ekström won the pole only.

Teams and drivers
In the 2012 DTM season lined-up eight drivers on for three teams. Mattias Ekström, Timo Scheider, Adrien Tambay and Rahel Frey start for Abt Sportsline. Phoenix Racing approached with Miguel Molina and Mike Rockenfeller. Filipe Albuquerque and Edoardo Mortara raced for Team Rosberg.

In the 2013 DTM season lined-up eight drivers on for four teams. Mattias Ekström and Jamie Green start for Abt Sportsline. Mike Rockenfeller and Miguel Molina for Phoenix Racing. Timo Scheider and Adrien Tambay start for Audi Sport Team Abt. Filipe Albuquerque and Edoardo Mortara start for Team Rosberg.

RS5 DTM

After the 2012 season, the vehicle was renamed RS5 DTM, correspond with the Audi RS5 production model. It is powered by a naturally-aspirated engine and 2xDOHC camshafts. The engine itself is a custom-built Audi 4.0 L V8 with four valves per cylinder and a 90 degree V-angle. Front engined and longitudinally mounted engine mounting layout, the RS5's engine is indirect fuel injected. The RS5 DTM's ECU is a Bosch Motronic MS 5.1 and other components such as the CDI ignition are also supplied by Bosch. Audi RS5 DTM's debut during DTM preseason test at Circuit de Catalunya on 26–28 March 2013 by all Audi teams and drivers.

The Audi RS5 DTM's race debut was at the 2013 Hockenheimring DTM round on 5 May 2013. Audi Sport Team Abt's Timo Scheider won the pole only.

On 4 March 2014, the RS5 DTM was redesigned and launched during 2014 Geneva Motor Show. During development, the vehicle was codenamed "RC3."

After the 2018 2nd Hockenheimring rounds and Jerez post-season testing of the Deutsche Tourenwagen Masters, the Audi RS5 DTM machine was permanently retired from competition and replaced with the newly-turbo updated Audi RS5 Turbo DTM machine starting from the 2019 season.

Production Edition
The Audi A5 DTM is special version of the standard Audi A5 production car. It was revealed at the 2013 International Motor Show at Geneva on March 6, 2013, in celebration of Mike Rockenfeller's 2013 DTM overall victory. It includes a choice of 4 engines (2.0 TDI quattro, 3.0 TDI quattro, 2.0 TFSI quattro, and 3.0 TFSI quattro); a choice of 3 body colours (Misano red, Daytona gray and Glacier white), DTM badges on the door sill trims, fenders and the side sills; a fixed rear wing in body color, exterior mirrors in aluminum look, and 20-inch cast aluminum wheels in a 5 V-spoke design. Only 300 such vehicles were built.

The vehicle went on sale on 21 October 2013.

Gallery

References

External links

Audi RS5 DTM Car Specifications

RS5 DTM
Deutsche Tourenwagen Masters cars